Costa Mediterranea is a  operated by Adora Cruises. She was constructed at the Kvaerner Masa-Yards Helsinki New Shipyard, Finland at a cost of over  €400 million. On June 16, 2003 she departed on her maiden voyage from Genoa to Spain and Portugal.

The twelve decks are named after mythological and historical characters: Circe, Tersicore, Bacco, Teseo, Orfeo, Narciso, Prometeo, Pegaso, Armonia, Cleopatra, Pandora and Medea.

In 2021, Costa Mediterranea was transferred to CSSC Carnival Cruise Shipping.

Refurbishment
Costa Mediterranea was dry docked for a €4 million refurbishment at the Fincantieri shipyard in Palermo from November 21, 2013 to December 4, 2013.

Ports of call
On 10 September 2008, Costa Mediterranea was the first ship to make a port call to the Passenger Port of St. Petersburg in Saint Petersburg, Russia.

References

External links
 
Official website
 Photos & video of Costa Mediterranea in Yalta, Ukraine
 Video Clip of Costa Mediterranea
 Miramar Ship Index - Costa Mediterranea

Ships built in Helsinki
Mediterranea
Panamax cruise ships
2003 ships